Wilfred Walter (2 March 1882 in Ripon, West Riding of Yorkshire – 9 July 1958 in Ashtead, Surrey) was an English film and theatre actor, sometimes credited as Wilfrid Walter. He was born Franz Wilfrid Walter, son of the actor Richard Walter.

Career

He was a Shakespearian actor during the first half of the 20th century, playing at the Theatre Royal, Drury Lane, Stratford-upon-Avon and the Old Vic, where his major roles included Mark Antony, Falstaff, Othello, Bottom and Titus Andronicus. 

His best-known film role was as Max Slessor the eponymous inmate in the 1938 comedy Convict 99, who is mistaken for the prison governor Benjamin Twist (Will Hay). Walter also acted as the monstrous lumbering brute Jake, Dr Orloff's (Bela Lugosi) assistant in the 1939 film adaption of the Edgar Wallace thriller The Dark Eyes of London.

Selected filmography
 Old Roses (1935)
 Hearts of Humanity (1936)
 Owd Bob (1938)
 Convict 99 (1938)
 The Dark Eyes of London (1939)
 A Window in London (1940)
 Night Train to Munich (1940) (uncredited)
 Caesar and Cleopatra (1945) (uncredited)
 No Highway in the Sky (1951) (uncredited)
 Judgment Deferred (1952)

References

External links
 
 

1882 births
1958 deaths
People from Ripon
English male film actors
English male stage actors
English male television actors
20th-century English male actors